Stéphane Dujarric de la Rivière (born in 1965) is the Spokesman for the United Nations Secretary-General António Guterres. He was appointed to this position on 19 February 2014, by the previous Secretary-General, Ban Ki-moon. Dujarric had previously served as Spokesman for United Nations Secretary-General Kofi Annan from 2005 to 2006 and then Deputy Communications Director for Secretary-General Ban Ki-moon from 2006 to 2007.

Career 
Prior to his current appointment, Dujarric was Director of News and Media for the United Nations Department of Public Information, a position that he had held since March 2011. In this role, he oversaw the UN's television, radio and photo operations. He coordinates the work of the main United Nations news sites, operating in eight languages. His Division is also responsible for media liaison and accreditation, providing logistical support and information to the international press corps, as well as coverage of official United Nations meetings, producing written coverage for the media, delegations and the general public, such as press releases, meetings summaries and dissemination of official statements and remarks. 

Prior to this assignment, Dujarric was Director of Communications for the United Nations Development Programme (UNDP).

Dujarric was named Chief Spokesman for United Nations Secretary-General Kofi Annan in 2005, after joining the United Nations in 2000 as an Associate Spokesman. During his time as Spokesman, he conducted daily briefings for the UN press corps and faced questions on a number of crises, notably the Oil-for-Food scandal and the Israel-Lebanon conflict. Following Annan's departure, Dujarric worked as Deputy Communications Director for Secretary-General Ban Ki-moon. 
On 19 February 2014, it was announced that Dujarric would once again become the spokesman for the UN Secretary General, replacing Martin Nesirky who had held that position for four years.

Before joining the United Nations, Dujarric worked for ABC News television for close to ten years in various capacities in the network's New York City, London and Paris news bureaux. He traveled extensively on assignment to cover major stories throughout Europe, Africa and the Middle East.

Born in France, Dujarric has been living in the United States for the most part of the last 40 years. He is a graduate of Georgetown University's School of Foreign Service.

References

1965 births
French emigrants to the United States
French officials of the United Nations
Journalists from Paris
Living people
Spokespersons for the Secretary-General of the United Nations
Walsh School of Foreign Service alumni